Mutilator Defeated at Last is the sixteenth studio album by the American psychedelic rock band Thee Oh Sees, released on May 18, 2015 on Castle Face Records. The album is the tenth to be released under the name, Thee Oh Sees.

The album is the first to feature bass guitarist Tim Hellman, and the only studio album to feature drummer Nick Murray; both of whom joined the band to tour in support of its previous release, Drop (2014). The album also features regular collaborator Chris Woodhouse listed among the band's core line-up, and former member Brigid Dawson returning as the album's backing vocalist.

In February 2016, the band released two unreleased tracks from the album's recording sessions, "Fortress" and "Man in a Suitcase".

Critical reception

Mutilator Defeated at Last received widespread acclaim from music critics. At Metacritic, which assigns a normalized rating out of 100 to reviews from mainstream critics, the album received an average score of 82 based on 13 reviews, indicating "universal acclaim".

In a positive review, AllMusic's Tim Sendra praised core member John Dwyer's songwriting and the album's overall aesthetic, writing: "Dwyer continues to crank out consistently great to amazing songs and albums that overflow with hot-wired guitars, over-revved vocals, and giant, jagged hooks. [...] After Drop some might have expected Thee Oh Sees to continue to explore their softer side, Mutilator Defeated At Last confounds those expectations. Blows them up, really, in a giant fireball of guitars, noise, and psychedelic power." In another positive review Pitchforks Aaron Leitko wrote: "As with Drop, this extra polish and attention benefits Mutilator. There are tasteful psychedelic embellishments—synth wooshes, delay trails—and new instrumentation, like electric organ and acoustic guitar. The fuzz and grime have been peeled back a little, leaving room for more density and detail."

NMEs Cian Traynor praised the contributions of new members Tim Hellman and Nick Murray, writing: "The new rhythm section of Tim Hellman and Nick Murray slot seamlessly into place, helping bandleader John Dwyer capture a sound that epitomises Thee Oh Sees: tight but unhinged, urgent but infectious." Writing for The Quietus, Nick Hutchings also praised the album, writing: "Thee Oh Sees have a daunting discography, but much like The Fall they offer an entire and immersive universe in which you may not need any other band, or any other sensory sustenance."

Track listing

Personnel
Thee Oh Sees
John Dwyer – guitars, lead vocals, synths, mellotron
Tim Hellman – bass guitar
Nick Murray – drums
Chris Woodhouse – synth, mellotron, percussion
Brigid Dawson – backing vocals

Recording personnel
Chris Woodhouse – recording and mixing

Artwork
Tetsunori Tawaraya – cover artwork
John Dwyer – photographs
Doctor Matthew Jones – layout

References

2015 albums
Oh Sees albums
Castle Face Records albums